Chipstable is a village and civil parish in Somerset, England, situated beside Heydon Hill  west of Taunton in the Somerset West and Taunton district.  The parish has a population of 309.

The parish includes Raddington and Waterrow.

History

The name Chipstable means "Cippa's post".

The manor was held by Muchelney Abbey from the Norman Conquest until the Dissolution of the Monasteries, and then passing to the Bluets of Greenham in Stawley. The parishes of Chipstable and Raddington were part of the Williton and Freemanners Hundred.

The village of Waterrow developed from hamlets called east and west Skirdle.

Governance

The parish council has responsibility for local issues, including setting an annual precept (local rate) to cover the council's operating costs and producing annual accounts for public scrutiny. The parish council evaluates local planning applications and works with the local police, district council officers, and neighbourhood watch groups on matters of crime, security, and traffic. The parish council's role also includes initiating projects for the maintenance and repair of parish facilities, as well as consulting with the district council on the maintenance, repair, and improvement of highways, drainage, footpaths, public transport, and street cleaning. Conservation matters (including trees and listed buildings) and environmental issues are also the responsibility of the council.

The village falls within the non-metropolitan district of Somerset West and Taunton, which was established on 1 April 2019. It was previously in the district of Taunton Deane, which was formed on 1 April 1974 under the Local Government Act 1972, and part of Wellington Rural District before that. The district council is responsible for local planning and building control, local roads, council housing, environmental health, markets and fairs, refuse collection and recycling, cemeteries and crematoria, leisure services, parks, and tourism.

Somerset County Council is responsible for running the largest and most expensive local services such as education, social services, libraries, main roads, public transport, policing and fire services, trading standards, waste disposal and strategic planning.

It is also part of the Taunton Deane county constituency represented in the House of Commons of the Parliament of the United Kingdom. It elects one Member of Parliament (MP) by the first past the post system of election, and was part of the South West England constituency of the European Parliament prior to Britain leaving the European Union in January 2020, which elected seven MEPs using the d'Hondt method of party-list proportional representation.

Geography

The parish lies between the Brendon Hills and the River Tone.

Hurstone Farm Woodlands in Waterrow is a woodland on the banks of the River Tone, which has been designated as a local nature reserve. The woodland, hedgerows and open grassland provide a habitat for dormice, otter and several bat species. Bryophyte species include black spleenwort.

Religious sites

The Church of England parish Church of St Michael in Raddington dates from the 13th and 14th centuries and has been designated as a grade I listed building.

The Church of All Saints in Chipstable village is more recent having been built in the 15th century. The tower and part of the nave remain from a previous building of about 1239.
England cricketer Jos Buttler got married here in October 2017.

Bethel Chapel, was built as a Congregational church in 1890.

Waterrow Church Hall was also built in Waterrow in 1908 for the people of Waterrow to save the journey uphill to Chipstable for services.  Waterrow Church Hall now provides local church services for the inhabitants of Waterrow and beyond.

References

External links

 Village web site
 Church web site

Villages in Taunton Deane
Civil parishes in Somerset